Khumbu Pasanglhamu is a rural municipality (Gaunpalika) out of 7 rural municipalities located at Solukhumbu district of Province No. 1 of Nepal. Khumjung, Namche & Jubing (1,5,7–9 No. Wards of Jubing) and Chaurikharka were incorporated while creating it. The admin centre of this gaunpalika is that of the Chaurikharka.

Previously, Khumjung, Namche, Jubing and Chaurikharka were all separate local level body (Village development committee) of Solukhumbu District. Solukhumbu was a district out of six districts of Sagarmatha Zone. Sagarmatha was a zone (division) of Eastern development region of Nepal.

Etymology
Khumbu Pasanglhamu is located in Solukhumbu District, which name also bear Khumbu. "Solukhumbu" is a combination of two words; "Solu" and "Khumbu". Solu is lower part, while Khumbu is upper part of Solukhumbu District. The "Pasanglhamu" word is taken from Pasang Lhamu Sherpa, who was first Nepalese lady who climbed Mount Everest, she hailed from Khumbu region.

Geography and Climate
Khumbu Pasanglhamu is situated at coordinates 27.74° N 86.73° E Latitude and longitude. It is on northernmost part of Province, which is highest altitude land on Earth, part of higher Himalayas. Geographical condition of Khumbu Pasanglhamu is very difficult. It is the highest elevated land of the world.

Lhotse, Nuptse, Cho Oyu, Ama Dablam, Pumori, Thamserku etc. are the mountains located in this region. Kharikhola, Lukla, Phskding, Manju, Namche, Khumjung, Khunde, Tengboche, Forche, Pangboche, Phiriche etc. are the human settlement in the region.

The elevations of Khumbu Pasanglhamu is not equal, it starts from 2000m and ends at 8848m thus the climate in the region can be divided into four climate zones owing to the gradual rise in altitude. The climatic zones include a forested lower zone, a zone of alpine scrub, the upper alpine zone which includes upper limit of vegetation growth, and the Arctic zone thus the temperature and weather conditions vary at different altitudes or zones. The upper zones are snow-capped mountains which is too cold and the lower zone's valleys are some less cold.

References

 
Solukhumbu District
Rural municipalities in Koshi Province
Rural municipalities of Nepal established in 2017
Rural municipalities in Solukhumbu District